Bama is a town in Bama Yao Autonomous County, Guangxi Zhuang Autonomous Region, China. There are Zhuang, Han, Yao, Mulao and Maonan nationalities living here.

Administrative division
As of 2015, the town is divided into four communities and fourteen villages: 
 Chengdong Community
 Chengzhong Community
 Chengnan Community
 Chengbei Community
 Bama
 Bafa
 Baliao
 Shezhang
 Panyang
 Fafu
 Lianxiang
 Poteng
 Bading
 Cifu
 Naba
 Longhong
 Jiemo
 Yuanji

Geography
The town borders Fenghuang Township in the north, Dahua Yao Autonomous County in the east, Natao Township in the south, and the townships of Jiazhuan, Yandong and Xishan in the west.

The Panyang River flows through the town west to east.

There are two major reservoirs in the town, namely the Bading Reservoir and Enzhu Reservoir.

Demographics

The population of Bama, according to the 2018 census, is 87,000.

Economy
The town's economy is based on nearby mineral resources and agricultural resources. The main varieties of crops are rice, soybean, corn and hemp. Diabase, titanium, manganese, copper, mineral water and gold are the six major minerals in the town.

The Bama miniature pig is a local specialty pig.

Education
 Bama No. 1 High School

Tourist attractions
The Longevity Museum is a museum in the town.

The Bama Yao Autonomous County National Stadium is a gymnasium in the town.

The Mujishan Park is a public park located in the town.

Transportation
The Provincial Highway S209 passes across the town northwest to southeast.

The National Highway G323 travels through the town northeast to southwest.

References

Bibliography
 

Towns of Hechi
Divisions of Bama Yao Autonomous County